Trechus stratiotes is a species of ground beetle in the subfamily Trechinae. It was described by Schmidt in 2009.

References

stratiotes
Beetles described in 2009